The Daytona Beach Explorers was a baseball club that played in the Senior Professional Baseball Association in 1990. They were a replacement team when the originals Bradenton Explorers relocated to Daytona Beach, Florida, and played its games at the Jackie Robinson Ballpark.

Managed by Clete Boyer and coached by Tony Cloninger, the Beach Explorers had registered an 11–11 record and was in fourth place when the league ceased operations on December 28, 1990.

Notable players

Derek Botelho
César Cedeño
Stan Cliburn 
Stew Cliburn 
José Cruz
Orlando González
Ross Grimsley
Garth Iorg
Jeff Jones
Wayne Krenchicki
Pete LaCock
Rick Lysander
Mickey Mahler
Tippy Martinez
Omar Moreno
Ken Reitz
Dave Sax
George Vukovich 
Ron Washington
Tack Wilson

Sources

Senior Professional Baseball Association teams
1990 establishments in Florida
Baseball teams established in 1990
Sports in Daytona Beach, Florida
Defunct baseball teams in Florida
1990 disestablishments in Florida
Baseball teams disestablished in 1990